Chimo! (Inuit for "Hello") was a Canadian jazz-rock/jazz fusion band, founded in 1969. The band played with some of the biggest acts of their era, and recorded one album, Cross Country Man for Revolver Records.

History
Chimo! evolved from Georgian IV, a band formed in Parry Sound in 1962 by John Johnson, Ross Raby, Stewart McCann and Rick King. After seven years of increasing success the band saw major personnel changes and, in 1969, changed its name to Chimo!, with the original line-up of Jack Mowbray (guitar), Tony Collacott (keyboards), Ross Raby (keyboards, vocals), John Johnson (guitar), Andy Cree (drums), and Breen La Boeuf (lead vocals).

Also in 1969, the band played alongside Chicago at the Toronto Rock and Roll Revival and, on June 28, 1970, opened the second day of the Festival Express with The Band and Janis Joplin at the Canadian National Exhibition Stadium. They also appeared at the Midsummer Night Rock Festival at Michigan State Fairgrounds Coliseum  with Alice Cooper, The Poor Souls, Iggy & The Stooges, and others.

Following the release of the band's album Cross Country Man in November 1970, Andy Cree left to do sessions for David Wiffen before joining Anne Murray's band. He was replaced by Pat Little, who had previously been with Luke & The Apostles, and had been doing session work for Van Morrison and Peter, Paul & Mary. The new line-up was responsible for two singles, Little's "In The Sea" and Mowbray's "Cross Country Man".

In 1971, Raby, Johnson and Collacott left the band to start families (save for Collacott, who would have no children). Little joined the band Heaven and Earth, and then founded the band Flag. LeBoeuf joined a re-formed Motherlode and, in 1977, Offenbach.

Personnel 
 Breen LeBoeuf: vocals 
 Ross Raby: organ, vocals 
 Jack Mowbray: guitars, vocals 
 John Johnson: bass, vocals 
 Andy Cree: drums, percussion 
 Pat Little: drums, percussion
 Tony Collacott: piano

Recordings

References

Sources
 "1,500 rock groups in search of smash records", Toronto Telegram, September 17, 1970, page 33
 Bill Munson's sleeve for Chimo! CD on Pacemaker
 Interview with Breen LeBoeuf, 2004 I love Chimo!

Canadian rock music groups
Revolver Records (Canada) artists